or  is a traditional sport in the gaucho culture of Argentina and the Cono Sur – Paraguay, Uruguay, Chile and the Rio Grande do Sul of Brazil. The objective is for the rider to stay on an untamed horse for a number of seconds. The specified time varies from 8 to 14 seconds, depending on the category. In Argentina it may be considered a part of the national intangible cultural heritage.

The event forms part of the programme of the annual  held at Jesús María in the province of Córdoba. Under the rules of the competition there, there are three categories:
  or bareback: the rider holds on to a leather strap passed round the neck of the horse and must stay mounted for 8 seconds; spurs are used
  or : the horse carries a girthed pad of sheepskin in the place of a saddle; the rider holds the reins in one hand, a whip in the other and must stay mounted for 12 seconds.
 : the horse is saddled; the rider must not lose the stirrups and must stay mounted for 14 seconds.

The rider may not touch the horse with his/her hands at any time.

See also 
Sport in Argentina
Chilean rodeo
Rodeo
Bronc riding

References 

Working stock horse sports
Sport in Argentina 
Sport in Chile 
Sport in Paraguay
Sport in Uruguay
Equestrian sports in Argentina
Equestrian sports in Chile
Equestrian sports in Paraguay
Equestrian sports in Uruguay